Jeremiah F. Twomey (June 16, 1874 in Brooklyn, Kings County, New York – October 3, 1963 in Jamaica, Queens, New York City) was an American politician from New York.

Life
He attended school in Long Island City, and then became a pharmacist. He married Mary J. Monahan (1884–1963), and their only child was Palma J. (Twomey) Sullivan (born c.1907).

Twomey was a member of the New York State Assembly (Kings Co., 15th D.) in 1916, 1917 and 1918.

He was a member of the New York State Senate (10th D.) from 1919 to 1944, sitting in the 142nd, 143rd, 144th, 145th, 146th, 147th, 148th, 149th, 150th, 151st, 152nd, 153rd, 154th, 155th, 156th, 157th, 158th, 159th, 160th, 161st, 162nd, 163rd and 164th New York State Legislatures; and was Chairman of the Committee on Finance from 1933 to 1938.

He died on October 3, 1963, in Queens General Hospital in Jamaica, Queens.

Sources

Twomey family at Ancestry.com
The State Employee (Vol. 6, No. 5; June 1937; with portrait on pg. 9)

1874 births
1963 deaths
Politicians from Brooklyn
Democratic Party members of the New York State Assembly
Democratic Party New York (state) state senators